Crisium may refer to:

Mare Crisium
Križevci in Croatia, Crisium in Latin